Richard Luce may refer to:
 Richard Luce, Baron Luce  (born 1936), British Conservative government minister, Lord Chamberlain to the Queen, Governor of Gibraltar
 Richard Luce (surgeon) (1867–1952), British medical doctor, army general, MP for Derby

See also 
 Luce (name)